The 2020 United States Senate election in Iowa was held on November 3, 2020, to elect a member of the United States Senate to represent the State of Iowa, concurrently with the 2020 U.S. presidential election, as well as other elections to the United States Senate in other states and elections to the United States House of Representatives and various state and local elections. Primaries were held on June 2.

Most experts and pollsters considered this race and the concurrent presidential race as a tossup due to incumbent President Donald Trump's low approval ratings and Ernst's own popularity dropping in polls. Despite this, Ernst was reelected by a larger-than-expected 6.6 points, while Trump simultaneously won the state with a similarly unexpected margin of victory. Ernst carried an overwhelming majority of the state's counties including many rural ones, while Greenfield carried only eight counties: Polk, Linn, Scott, Johnson, Black Hawk, Story, Cerro Gordo and Jefferson.

Republican primary

Candidates

Nominee
Joni Ernst, incumbent U.S. Senator

Withdrawn
Paul Rieck

Endorsements

Results

Democratic primary

On June 2, 2020, Theresa Greenfield won the Democratic primary with 47.71% of the vote, defeating three other major candidates, including Michael Franken, a retired U.S. Navy admiral and former aide to U.S. Senator Ted Kennedy.

Candidates

Nominee
Theresa Greenfield, businesswoman, candidate for Iowa's 3rd congressional district in 2018

Eliminated in primary
Michael Franken, retired U.S. Navy admiral and former aide to U.S. Senator Ted Kennedy
Kimberly Graham, child welfare attorney
Eddie Mauro, businessman, teacher, candidate for Iowa's 3rd congressional district in 2018

Withdrawn
Cal Woods, journalist and U.S. Navy veteran (endorsed Michael T. Franken) (remained on ballot)

Declined
 Cindy Axne, incumbent U.S. Representative for Iowa's 3rd congressional district (running for reelection, endorsed Greenfield)
 Chet Culver, former Governor of Iowa
 Deirdre DeJear, nominee for Secretary of State of Iowa in 2018
 Abby Finkenauer, incumbent U.S. Representative for Iowa's 1st congressional district (running for reelection, endorsed Greenfield)
 Amber Gustafson, candidate for the Iowa Senate in 2018 (endorsed Greenfield)
Rita Hart, former state senator and nominee for Lieutenant Governor of Iowa in 2018 (running in Iowa's 2nd congressional district)
 Rob Hogg, state senator
 Liz Mathis, state senator
 Rob Sand, Iowa State Auditor
 J.D. Scholten, nominee for Iowa's 4th congressional district in 2018 (running in Iowa's 4th congressional district)
Tom Vilsack, former Governor of Iowa and former U.S. Secretary of Agriculture
Stacey Walker, Linn County supervisor (endorsed Graham)
Steve Warnstadt, former state senator and intelligence officer in the Iowa Army National Guard

Debates

Endorsements

Polling

Results

Other candidates

Libertarian Party

Nominee
 Rick Stewart, Libertarian nominee for the 2018 Iowa Secretary of Agriculture election and independent candidate for the 2014 United States Senate election in Iowa

Independents

Declared
 Suzanne Herzog, economist and former ER nurse

General election

Major media described the campaign as one of the most likely to decide control of the Senate after the 2020 election. Polls conducted after the primary showed a close contest between Greenfield and Ernst, with neither candidate leading by more than 4 points.

Through June 2020, Greenfield had raised $11.5 million, compared to $14.6 million for Ernst but by September, Greenfield had pulled ahead, raising $40.0 million compared to $21.6 million for Ernst. The race was expected to be the most expensive in the state's history, and the second most expensive Senate race in the United States, after the 2020 United States Senate election in North Carolina, where Cal Cunningham challenged Thom Tillis.

Debate

Predictions

Endorsements

Polling

Graphical summary

Aggregate polling

with Eddie Mauro

with Joni Ernst and generic Democrat

with Joni Ernst and Generic Opponent

with generic Republican and generic Democrat

Results 

Counties that flipped from Democratic to Republican
 Clinton (largest municipality: Clinton)
 Des Moines (largest municipality: Burlington)
 Dubuque (largest municipality: Dubuque)
 Floyd (largest municipality: Charles City)
 Howard (largest municipality: Cresco)
 Lee (largest municipality: Fort Madison)
 Worth (largest municipality: Northwood)

Counties that flipped from Republican to Democratic
 Scott (largest municipality: Davenport)

See also
 2020 Iowa elections

Notes
Partisan clients

Voter samples

References

Further reading

External links
  (State affiliate of the U.S. League of Women Voters)
 
Official campaign websites
 Joni Ernst (R) for Senate
 Theresa Greenfield (D) for Senate
 Suzanne Herzog (I) for Senate 
 Rick Stewart (L) for Senate

2020
Iowa
United States Senate